Bruno Ferrante (born 26 April 1947 in Lecce) was Milan prefect from 8 June 2000 to November 2005. He ran in 2006 as a mayoral candidate in Milan for the centre-left coalition The Union, after having won a primary election with around 67.85% of votes. The other contender for the nomination was Dario Fo.

Graduated in jurisprudence at University of Pisa, he is married with two children.

References

External links
 Official site 

1947 births
Living people
Italian politicians
People from Lecce
Honorary Knights Commander of the Order of the British Empire